Tomasz Wylenzek (born 9 January 1983 in Nowe Chechło, Silesia, Poland) is a German sprint canoeist who has competed since the early 2000s.

Wylenzek won two junior world championship titles in 2001 at Curitiba, Brazil. The following year, still only 19, he was promoted to the German senior squad as C-2 partner for the more experienced Christian Gille. At the 2002 World Championships in Seville, they finished seventh in the 500 m final.

At Wylenzek's first Olympics in Athens, he and Gille won a surprise gold in the C-2 1000 m event.
 
In 2005 Gille and Wylenzek completely dominated the C-2 event, showing that their Athens victory was not a fluke. A clean sweep of medals (200 m, 500 m and 1000 m) at the European Championships in Poznań, Poland, in May was followed by two golds (500 m and 1000 m) at the World Championships in Zagreb.

2006 proved a disappointment after the highs of the previous two years. Gille and Wylenzek lost out to Stefan Holtz and Robert Nuck in the German C-2 500 m trial and were therefore unable to defend their European and world titles over that distance. Wylenzek was philosophical as they lost their other titles too, coming away with just two silver medals at the major championships (European C-2 1000 m and world C-2 200 m).

Wylenzek won two more Olympic medals at Beijing in 2008 with a silver in the C-1 1000 m and a bronze in the C-2 500 m events. since those games, he has won two more world championships medals with a gold in 2009 (C-2 1000 m) and a bronze in 2010 (C-4 1000 m).

Wylenzek lives in Essen.

References
Canoe09.ca profile

Official website 

Sunnyboy mit starkem Finish Markus Wessel / WDR.de

1983 births
Tarnowskie Góry County
Canoeists at the 2004 Summer Olympics
Canoeists at the 2008 Summer Olympics
German male canoeists
Living people
Olympic canoeists of Germany
Olympic gold medalists for Germany
Olympic silver medalists for Germany
Olympic bronze medalists for Germany
German people of Polish descent
Naturalized citizens of Germany
Olympic medalists in canoeing
People from Tarnowskie Góry County
ICF Canoe Sprint World Championships medalists in Canadian
Medalists at the 2008 Summer Olympics
Medalists at the 2004 Summer Olympics